Tianjin Huochetou Football Club was a professional Chinese former football club that last participated in China League Two. The team was based in Tianjin and their home stadium was the Tianjin Huochetou Stadium, which has a seating capacity of 12,000. Their last major investors were the China Railway Corporation.

The club was originally established in 1950 by the Ministry of Railways of the People's Republic of China and were one of the founding members of the 1951 Chinese league championship. In 1994 the club was reorganized to become a completely professional football unit. At the end of the 2016 China League Two season, the club disbanded.

Results
All-time League rankings
As of the end of 2016 season.

No league games in 1959, 1966–72.
Did not compete in 1963–65, 1973, 1983–86, 1999–2003 and 2011.
 In group stage * In final group stage

Key 
 Pld = Played
 W = Games won
 D = Games drawn
 L = Games lost
 F = Goals for
 A = Goals against
 Pts = Points
 Pos = Final position

 DNQ = Did not qualify
 DNE = Did not enter
 NH = Not Held
- = Does Not Exist
 R1 = Round 1
 R2 = Round 2
 R3 = Round 3
 R4 = Round 4

 F = Final
 SF = Semi-finals
 QF = Quarter-finals
 R16 = Round of 16
 Group = Group stage
 GS2 = Second Group stage
 QR1 = First Qualifying Round
 QR2 = Second Qualifying Round
 QR3 = Third Qualifying Round

References

External links
Team profile at Official FA website

Football clubs in China
Defunct football clubs in China
Sport in Tianjin
Railway association football clubs in China
1950 establishments in China
Association football clubs established in 1950